Metamora Township, Township 27 North, Range 2 West of the Third Principal Meridian, is located in Woodford County, Illinois. It includes the village of Metamora, Illinois and is accessible by State Routes 89 and 116.  State Route 117 runs along the southern part of its eastern border.

As of the 2010 census, its population was 4,357 and it included 1,741 housing units.

Geography

Demographics

References

External links
 City-data.com
 Illinois State Archives

Townships in Woodford County, Illinois
Townships in Illinois